Tareiza Hakam Hani Al-Oudat (born 3 December 1992) is a Jordanian footballer who plays as a forward. She has been a member of the Jordan women's national team.

Club career
Al-Oudat has played for Amman in Jordan.

International career
Al-Oudat capped for Jordan at senior level during the 2014 AFC Women's Asian Cup qualification.

Personal life
Al-Oudat is Christian.

References

External links

1992 births
Living people
Sportspeople from Amman
Jordanian women's footballers
Women's association football forwards
Jordan Women's Football League players
Jordan women's international footballers
Footballers at the 2014 Asian Games
Asian Games competitors for Jordan
Jordanian Christians